The Swiss Barefoot Company is a sock manufacturer based in Switzerland.

Products 
Swiss Protection Sock (SPS); a toe sock made of kevlar with tiny rubber dots on the bottom designed to be worn as a minimalist shoe and offer more protection than an ordinary sock. It comes in standard and low-cut versions.

Free Your Feet (FYF) Sock; a development of the Swiss Protection Sock made of Dyneema. The company claims that this is "the most minimalist footwear ever".

See also

List of sock manufacturers

References

Footwear
Socks
Hosiery brands